The Minister of Labour for Northern Ireland was a member of the Executive Committee of the Privy Council of Northern Ireland (Cabinet) in the Parliament of Northern Ireland which governed Northern Ireland from 1921 to 1972. The post was retitled the Minister of Labour and National Insurance in 1949, and abolished in 1965.

Parliamentary Secretary to the Ministry of Home Affairs
1921 – 1938 John Fawcett Gordon
1938 – 1941 William Grant

References
The Government of Northern Ireland

1921 establishments in Northern Ireland
1965 disestablishments in Northern Ireland
Executive Committee of the Privy Council of Northern Ireland